Bulbophyllum elisae, commonly known as the pineapple orchid,  is a species of epiphytic or lithophytic orchid that is endemic to eastern Australia. It has crowded, wrinkled, pale green or yellowish clump-forming pseudobulbs, stiff, pale green to yellowish leaves and between three and twelve pale green to dark green flowers with a dark red to purple labellum. It usually grows in the tops of rainforest trees, on cliff faces or boulders.

Description
Flowering occurs between May and November.

Taxonomy and naming
The pineapple orchid was first formally described in 1868 by Ferdinand von Mueller who gave it the name Cirrhopetalum elisae and published the description in the Fragmenta phytographiae Australiae from a specimen collected near Tenterfield. In 1873, George Bentham changed the name to Bulbophyllum elisae. The specific epithet (elisae) honours Eliza Kern.

Distribution and habitat
Bulbophyllum elisae grows on the highest branches of rainforest trees, sometimes on cliff faces and boulders. It occurs between the Bunya Mountains in Queensland and the Blue Mountains in New South Wales.

References 

elisae
Orchids of New South Wales
Orchids of Queensland
Endemic orchids of Australia
Plants described in 1871
Taxa named by Ferdinand von Mueller